Matt Percival is a British cartoonist known primarily for his single panel gag cartoons.

Biography
Percival's first gag cartoon appeared in Private Eye. Between 1999 and 2000, he was a regular contributor for King Features'''  US syndicated daily comic strip panel The New Breed.

His work has been published in various British and American publications including Private Eye , The Spectator , New Statesman , Air Mail , Prospect ,  The Oldie , The American Bystander , Harvard Business Review ,The Times and Punch.  He signs his work 'PERCIVAL'. Some of his drawings can be viewed on the British Cartoon Archive.

As a comedy writer, he contributed material performed at the NewsRevue 2012 Edinburgh Festival Fringe show.

Bibliography

Books
cartoons published in:
 The Penguin Book of Brexit Cartoons 2018 
 Private Eye Annual 2018 
 Blockchain is WTF (Waarschijnlijk Toch Fundamenteel)? 2017 
 Private Equity Laid Bare 2017 
 Private Eye Annual 2015 
 Draw The Line Here 2015 
 Private Equity 4.0 2015 
 Private Eye A Cartoon History 2013 
 Private Eye Annual 2012 
 Private Eye Annual 1998''

Exhibitions
 'NOT the RA Summer Exhibition' - Chris Beetles Gallery, London 2016
 '1984' - The Kowalsky Gallery, London 2009

External links
Official website
Professional Cartoonists Organisation
British Cartoon Archive

References

British cartoonists
Private Eye contributors
The Spectator people
English artists
Year of birth missing (living people)
Living people